The Italian Catholic diocese of Acireale is in Sicily. It has existed since 1844. It is a suffragan of the archdiocese of Catania.

Bishops
Gerlando Maria Genuardi (1872–1907)
Giovanni Battista Arista (1907–1920)
Salvatore Bella (1920–1922)
Fernando Cento (1922–1926)
Evasio Colli (1927–1932)
Salvatore Russo (1932–1964)
Pasquale Bacile (1964–1979) 
Giuseppe Malandrino (1979–1998)
Salvatore Gristina (1999–2002)
Pio Vittorio Vigo (2002–2011), Archbishop (personal title)
Antonino Raspanti (2011–present)

See also
Acireale

Notes

External links

 Official page

Acireale
Acireale
Acireale
1844 establishments in Italy